Chanté Torrane Moore (born February 17, 1967) is an American singer-songwriter, television personality, and author. Rising to fame in the early 1990s, Moore established herself as an R&B singer.

Her debut studio album Precious was released in 1992. The album was certified gold by the RIAA on November 14, 1994, in the United States, spawning such R&B hits as "Love's Taken Over" and "It's Alright". Released in 1994, her second album, A Love Supreme, did not achieve the same success as her debut album.

In 1999, her third album, This Moment Is Mine, was released. The album included "Chanté's Got a Man", her first top 10 on the Billboard Hot 100 and No. 2 on the R&B chart, which became her signature song and her best charting song to date. She then released three more solo studio albums, Exposed (2000) Love the Woman (2008), Moore Is More (2013) and two collaborative albums Things That Lovers Do (2003), Uncovered/Covered (2006), both with Kenny Lattimore.

Aside from her success in music, Moore became a television personality in 2013, being involved in TV One's reality series R&B Divas: Los Angeles for three seasons before it was cancelled.

Early life
Born to Christian Evangelist parents, Moore grew up singing in the church and was heavily influenced by the music of George Duke and Lee Ritenour. She was a beauty pageant contestant and model when, at age twenty-two, she was discovered by MCA Records executive Louil Silas.

Career

1991–1995: Debut album Precious, breakthrough and A Love Supreme
Moore was signed to Silas' MCA-distributed imprint Silas Records. She had previously been signed to Warner Bros Records by Benny Medina at the age of 19, recording a whole album before being dropped. In 1991, a song "Candlelight and You" featuring Moore's vocals with R&B singer Keith Washington was featured on the House Party 2 soundtrack, and she immediately began recording her solo debut album.

On September 29, 1992, Silas Records and MCA Records released Moore's debut album, Precious. The album featured production from Simon Law, Bebe Winans, George Duke, among others, and peaked at number one-hundred and one on the U.S. Billboard 200 albums chart. The first single, "Love's Taken Over" peaked at number eighty-six and number thirteen on the Billboard Hot 100 and R&B Singles charts, respectively. The album's second single, It's Alright failed to make impact on the Billboard Hot 100, however, peaking at number thirteen on the R&B charts. More singles from Precious were released in 1993, including "As If We Never Met" and "Who Do I Turn To?". The album was certified gold by the RIAA on November 14, 1994.

On November 15, 1994, Moore released her second album A Love Supreme which peaked at sixty-four on the Billboard 200 albums chart. Moore was one of the co-executive producers of the album and co-wrote eight of its songs, along with Fred Moultrie. The album's first single, "Old School Lovin'", peaked at number nineteen on the R&B chart, marking her third top 20 R&B song. Three more songs were released from the album: "This Time" (1994), "I'm What You Need" (1995) and "Free/Sail On" (1995). In 1995, Moore appeared on the soundtrack to the hit film Waiting to Exhale and featured on five tracks, performing a solo on "Wey U," and adding backing vocals on the hit single, "Count On Me."

1999–2002: This Moment Is Mine, divorce and Exposed
In 1999, she released her third album This Moment Is Mine, which was led by her biggest single to date, "Chanté's Got a Man", written for then-husband Kadeem Hardison. It peaked at number ten on the Billboard Hot 100 chart and number two on the R&B chart and was certified gold. It was followed-up by the single "I See You in a Different Light" with JoJo Hailey of Jodeci and included as the theme for the film For the Love of the Game starring Kevin Costner.

Following her divorce from Hardison, Moore worked with a different set of collaborators for the more contemporary R&B album Exposed, which followed in 2000 and included the singles "Straight Up" (produced by Jermaine Dupri) and "Bitter" for which the latter's video continued the saga of the R. Kelly and The Isley Brothers "Mr. Big" story.

In 2002, Moore had the distinction of winning a Soul Train Music Award for Best R&B/Soul Single for the song "Contagious", featuring The Isley Brothers and R. Kelly. The song was also nominated for a Grammy Award for Best R&B Performance by a Duo or Group with Vocal.

2003–2007: Duet albums with Kenny Lattimore: Things That Lovers Do and Covered/Uncovered
A year after marrying R&B singer Kenny Lattimore, the two signed as a duet act to Arista Records and released a duet cover album titled Things That Lovers Do in 2003. The album was promoted with a stageplay named after the album and a music video for the single "You Don't Have to Cry", which shows a prominently pregnant Moore on screen with Lattimore.

In fall 2006, Moore issued a follow-up to Things That Lovers Do, another album of duets with her then-husband Kenny Lattimore; a double-CD of gospel and R&B love songs titled Uncovered/Covered. The set was led off by dual singles, the Bryan-Michael Cox-produced "Figure It Out", and "Make Me Like the Moon", a gospel ballad co-written by Lattimore and Moore and produced by Fred Hammond. Uncovered/Covered was released  via LaFace/Verity/Zomba Music Group on October 10.

In 2007, Moore starred in the stageplay By Any Means Necessary, along with Dave Hollister, Tisha Campbell-Martin, Shar Jackson, and Danielle Mone Truitt.

2008–2011: Label change and Love the Woman
During the recording of her duet album with Lattimore, she signed a new solo recording contract with Peak Records, a subsidiary of Concord Music Group.

On June 17, 2008, Moore released her fifth solo album Love the Woman. The album's lead single "Ain't Supposed to Be This Way" impacted radio on May 12, 2008.

In 2009, Moore set some dates for a Love the Woman tour, with performances in Los Angeles, and Atlanta, Georgia. Additionally, she starred with James Pickens, Jr. (of Grey's Anatomy), Vickie Winans, Loretta Devine, Reginald VelJohnson, Rocky Carroll and Kenny Lattimore in a live stage production of Otis Sallid's Gospel! Gospel! Gospel at the Wilshire Ebell Theater in May 2009.

In July 2011, it was announced that she would be the TV host for an upcoming women's fitness reality series sponsored by SportyGirl Fitness. The following year, Moore performed at the 2012 BET Awards at the Shrine Auditorium in a tribute to the late singer Donna Summer.

2013–2015: Moore Is More, R&B Divas: Los Angeles and Will I Marry Me?
On January 1, 2013, Moore signed a new record deal with Shanachie Entertainment. She released her sixth studio solo album Moore Is More on July 30, which was preceded by the single "Talking in My Sleep".

In early 2013, it was also announced that Moore had joined the cast of the reality TV show R&B Divas: Los Angeles with Kelly Price, Dawn Robinson (of En Vogue), Michel'le, Lil' Mo and Claudette Ortiz. They filmed the series throughout the year, and it premiered/aired during the summer. A second season was filmed in 2014.

In March 2014, it was announced that Moore would start a limited run in Vegas on March 24 in the Bally's Las Vegas legendary show Jubilee!, after Terry Ellis (of En Vogue) had completed her run. The show was directed by Frank Gatson Jr. and also starred Grammy-nominated singer Luke James. The second season of R&B Divas: Los Angeles premiered in July 2014, and Moore released a digital single, "I Know, Right?", later that month.

She released her self-help book Will I Marry Me? in August 2014. Moore's manager, Cheryl Cobb Debrosse, began producing an adaptation of Will I Marry Me? into a one-woman show in 2015. That same year, Moore announced work on a new solo album which would include new material in addition to a few remakes of her songs, due to the experience of her one-woman show. The third (and final) season of R&B Divas: Los Angeles premiered on February 11, 2015.

2016–present: Seventh studio album, The Rise of the Phoenix
In 2016, she premiered a new track titled "Ghetto Love" featuring Kurupt on Donnie Simpson's radio show. Later in July, she appeared on the radio show to premiere her new single "Put It On Fate" of which she filmed a music video on July 13.

In January 2017, she announced a new single "Real One", released on February 3, 2017. It is the lead single off her album The Rise of the Phoenix. The song proved to be her most successful single in seventeen years, peaking at #10 on the US Adult R&B Songs chart and at #39 on the US R&B/Hip-Hop Airplay chart. Additionally, it was announced she would star in the stage play "Married But Single Too" set to premiere off-Broadway in February. In February, it was announced her seventh studio album The Rise of the Phoenix would be delayed to March, and then April the following month. On March 20, she premiered the music video for her single "Real One", which was directed by GVisuals. On June 26, Moore announced The Rise of the Phoenix would be released on September 9. On August 7, 2017, Moore released a promotional video announcing the album would be available to pre-order on August 11, along with revealing the cover art. She then released her second single, "Something to Remember", along with a music video. The following day the album's track list was announced. The album premiered on streaming services on September 8., while the digital release date was rescheduled to September 29 and the physical release for October 20.

Additionally, she released her first full-length Christmas album titled Christmas Back to You in November 2017.
 In March 2018, she premiered a new single "One Love" featuring Lewis Sky, ahead of a new EP, 1 of 4, released on April 5.

In September 2021, Moore released the single "Right One", which she co-wrote alongside Eric and Jovan Dawkins.

Personal life

In 1991, Moore married a friend from her childhood. 
In her 2014 autobiographical self-help book, Will I Marry Me?, she publicly revealed this marriage (and subsequent divorce), stating that the two had dated in sixth grade. Moore also shared that the friend was her first kiss at the age of 13.
Speaking of this time in her life, during an UNSUNG interview, she said: "After being in a couple of relationships that weren't so great, I was a little shy about love, so I thought, I'll outsmart love this time; I'll marry my friend."  After falling out of love with her husband in 1993, Moore met actor Kadeem Hardison. Filing for divorce, she then dated Kadeem. Moore's mother died on her brother's birthday on January 25, 1995.
In 1996, she and Kadeem welcomed a daughter named Sophia Hardison. The pair secretly married in 1997 and divorced in 2000.

Moore married singer Kenny Lattimore in a private ceremony in Jamaica on New Year's Day in 2002. Their son was born in 2003. On July 27, 2011, in a statement on her Facebook page, Moore announced that she and Kenny had divorced. Her older brother Kelvin Gomillion (born January 25, 1961) died on August 18, 2013.

On October 26, 2021, Moore announced her engagement to former BET Executive, Stephen G. Hill. The couple wed in Los Cabos, Mexico on October 22, 2022.

Discography

Solo albums
 Precious (1992)
 A Love Supreme (1994)
 This Moment Is Mine (1999)
 Exposed (2000)
 Love the Woman (2008)
 Moore Is More (2013)
 The Rise of the Phoenix (2017)
 Christmas Back to You (2017)

Collaborative albums
 Things That Lovers Do (with Kenny Lattimore) (2003)
 Uncovered/Covered (with Kenny Lattimore) (2006)

Awards and nominations

References

External links
 Official site
 

1967 births
20th-century African-American women singers
21st-century African-American women singers
African-American Christians
African-American women singer-songwriters
American contemporary R&B singers
American women pop singers
American gospel singers
American Pentecostals
American sopranos
Ballad musicians
Living people
MCA Records artists
Members of the Church of God in Christ
Singers from San Francisco
Singer-songwriters from California